Vanessa Bell Armstrong is the major-label debut album of gospel singer Vanessa Bell Armstrong. Though the artist had garnered Grammy- and Stellar-award nominations previously for her work as an independent artist, this album was the gospel artist's first foray into the mainstream market. The album was produced by Loris Holland as well as Marvin Winans of The Winans.

The album yielded a pair of singles, "Pressing On" and "You Bring Out The Best In Me." The former was also remixed and released in both 7" and 12" formats conducive to crossover into the dance-music market. This was notable as the crossover potential of gospel music was still not widely accepted.

Track listing 
 Pressing On (4:50)
 You Bring Out The Best In Me (4:24)
 Learn To Love (4:19)
 The Denied Stone (5:38)
 I Wanna Be Ready (4:35)
 Always (4:15)
 Living For You (4:25)
 Don't Turn Your Back (4:39)

References

External links 
 
 Vanessa Bell Armstrong on Discogs.com

1987 albums
Vanessa Bell Armstrong albums